Rasoul Yunan (born 1969  in a village near Urmia Lake, West Azerbaijan) is an Iranian poet of Iranian Azerbaijani descent.

He is primarily a Persian poet but is also a translator and writer of Persian literature and Azerbaijani literature both. His genre includes playwright, short story, dastan and modern poetry.

Notes

 
 
 
 

1969 births
People from Urmia
Living people
20th-century Iranian poets
Azerbaijani-language poets
Iranian male novelists
Iranian novelists
Iranian dramatists and playwrights
Iranian male short story writers
Iranian translators
Persian-language poets
20th-century Persian-language writers